Five ships of the Royal Navy have been named HMS Furious:

  was a 12-gun  launched in 1797 and sold in 1802.
  was a 12-gun  launched in 1804 and sold in 1815.
  was a wooden-hulled paddle frigate launched in 1850. She was hulked in 1867 and sold in 1884.
  was an Arrogant-class second class protected cruiser launched in 1896. She was hulked in 1915 and renamed Forte, and was sold in 1923.
  was a modified Courageous-class battlecruiser launched in 1916. She was converted to a flush-deck aircraft carrier between 1921 and 1925 and was sold in 1948.

Battle honours
Ships named Furious have earned the following battle honours:
Crimea, 1854−56
China, 1856−60
Narvik, 1940
Norway, 1940−41, 1944
Malta Convoys, 1942
North Africa, 1942−43

See also

Royal Navy ship names